The SNECMA-Régnier 4L is a French four cylinder air-cooled inverted inline piston engine, introduced shortly after the end of World War II.

Design and development
Régnier Motor Company's introduction to aircraft engine production came after acquisition of licences to build the de Havilland Gipsy Major and Gipsy Six. Though they remained influenced by de Havilland practice their products began to diverge and eventually contained original designs. By the mid-1930s they had several four cylinder air-cooled inverted inline engines on offer, including the R.4L-02 displayed at the 1936 Paris Air Show.

During the Occupation of France and in the years shortly after World War II, Régnier designed and produced a set of three simplified four-cylinder inverted air-cooled inline engines of increasing capacity and power, the 4J, 4K and 4L. The specifications of the post-war 4L engine are similar, though not identical to, those of the pre-war R.4, whilst those of the pre-war R.4L specifications are closer to that of the post-war 4K. In 1946 or 1947, Régnier, now nationalised, was absorbed into SNECMA and the 4L engines, the most widely used member of the series, became the SNECMA-Régnier 4L. Notable constructional features, shared with the 4J and 4K engines, included machined steel cylinder barrels with external baked-on anti-corrosion varnish and separate cylinder heads with unusual metallo-plastic seals, held to the crankcase by long bolts.  Screwed-in plug bushes and valve seats were made from aluminium-bronze. The 4L's five-bearing steel crankshaft was forged, as were the duralumin connecting rods which had split, steel backed, bronze bearings.  The crankcase was cast from aluminium alloy.

SNECMA continued to produce the 4L series until at least 1956. The most prolific type to use it was the military Nord NC.856A, with 112 examples.

Variants
Data from Jane's All the World's Aircraft 1956/57. The types are alternatively written as 4LO-4, etc. 
4LOearly post-war designation
4L-00 First post-war version, maximum continuous power  at 2,280 rpm.
4L-02 Higher compression ratio of 7.25:1, maximum take-off and continuous power  at 2,500 rpm.
4L-04 As 4L.00 but rearranged accessories.
4L-06 As 4L.02 but rearranged accessories.
4L-08 As 4L.04 but with higher compression ratio of 6.8:1, maximum take-off and continuous power .
4L-14
4L-20 -00 for inverted flight
4L-22 -02 for inverted flight
4L-24 -04 for inverted flight
4L-26 -06 for inverted flight
4L-28 -08 for inverted flight
4L-34 -14 for inverted flight

Applications
Data from: Gaillard (1990)

Specifications (Régnier 4L.00 )

See also

References

Air-cooled aircraft piston engines
Inverted aircraft piston engines
1940s aircraft piston engines
Snecma aircraft engines